Mohammed Mustafa Wasmi Al Taher (born 23 March 2000) is an Iraqi footballer who currently plays for Dibba Al Fujairah on loan from Al-Nasr as a defender.

Club career
Mohammed Mustafa started his career at Al-Bahri in his hometown, Basra. He earned a move to the UAE in 2019 and played for three different clubs in his first three seasons. In July 2022, he moved from Al-Nasr to newly-promoted Dibba FC.

References

External links
 

2000 births
Living people
People from Basra
Iraqi footballers
Association football defenders
Al-Mina'a SC players
Al-Bahri players
Dibba Al-Hisn Sports Club players
Fujairah FC players
Al-Nasr SC (Dubai) players
Dibba FC players
Iraqi Premier League players
UAE First Division League players
UAE Pro League players
Iraqi expatriate footballers
Iraqi expatriate sportspeople in the United Arab Emirates
Expatriate footballers in the United Arab Emirates